Canning  (also known as the  Georgian Quarter) is an area on the borders of Toxteth and Liverpool city centre, England. It has no formal definition but is generally agreed to be bounded to the south by Upper Parliament Street, to the east by Grove Street, to the north by Myrtle Street and to the west by Hope Street.

Canning is an area of almost entirely residential Georgian architecture, most of which strictly speaking dates from after the Georgian era. The area takes its name from one of its principal thoroughfares, Canning Street, which is named after George Canning, (1770–1827), a British politician who served as Foreign Secretary and, briefly, Prime Minister.

History
In 1800 the Liverpool Corporation Surveyor, John Foster, Sr., (1758–1827) prepared a gridiron plan for a large area of peat bog known as Mosslake Fields, which was to the east of Rodney Street. The area was built for and populated by the extremely wealthy of Liverpool. With the city's decline in the 20th century, the area grew unfashionable, and much of it became derelict. Areas along Upper Parliament St and Grove St and Myrtle St were demolished. The tide began to turn noticeably in the 1990s and the area is now much sought after. Nevertheless, the Office for National Statistics finds that it is one of the most deprived districts in the UK.

See also
Dukes Terrace
Gambier Terrace
Falkner Square
Liverpool Philharmonic Hall
Liverpool Institute of Performing Arts
German Church
St Bride's Church 
St Andrew's Church
Saint Philip Neri Church
Wellington Rooms 
Architecture of Liverpool

Bibliography
Buildings of Liverpool. Liverpool Heritage Bureau, 1978. 
Pevsner Architectural Guides — Liverpool. Joseph Sharples, 2004.

References

External links

Areas of Liverpool